The Serbia national under-19 football team (Serbian Latin: Omladinska reprezentacija Srbije) is the national under-19 football team of Serbia and is controlled by the Football Association of Serbia. The team is considered the successor to the Serbia and Montenegro national under-19 football team, which in turn was the successor to the Yugoslavia national under-19 football team.

Serbia won their first U19 title as independent country at the 2013 UEFA European Under-19 Championship, where they beat France in the final 1–0.

History
The Yugoslav U18 team represented the Socialist Federal Republic of Yugoslavia until the country dissolved in 1992.

From 1995, the under-18 team represented the Federal Republic of Yugoslavia. The FR Yugoslavia (and the team) changed its name to Serbia and Montenegro in 2003.

In 2006, Serbia and Montenegro separated and its governing body converted into the Football Association of Serbia.

Competition history

Their first international competition was on the 1951 FIFA Youth Tournament Under-18 where they beat Austria 3–2 in the final.

They also won the 1979 UEFA European Under-18 Championship beating Bulgaria 1–0 in the final.

The biggest success on the intercontinental stage happened on the 1987 FIFA World Youth Championship in Chile, when they became the world youth champions by beating the West Germany 5–4 in the final on a penalty shootout in Santiago. Because of that achievement, that generation was nicknamed Čileanci (The Chileans).

Since the changes in 2001. made by UEFA, when the competition received its current name and level (U19), the Serbian squad has reached the semifinals in 2005, 2009, 2011, and 2014.

In the 2013 UEFA European Under-19 Championship, the Serbian team became the European champion by beating France 1–0 in the final played in Marijampolė.

The semifinal appearance in 2014 qualified them for the 2015 FIFA U-20 World Cup.

Competitive Record
The Serbian Football Association is deemed the direct successor to both SFR Yugoslavia and Serbia and Montenegro by FIFA, and therefore the inheritor to all the records of the defunct nations.

 Champions   Runners-Up   Third Place   Fourth Place

UEFA European Under-19 Championship
UEFA European U-19 Championship Record as follows:

* Draws include knockout matches decided by penalty shootout.

Results and Fixtures

2022

2023

Players

Current squad
 The following players were called up for the 2023 UEFA European Under-19 Championship qualification matches.
 Match dates: 17, 20 and 23 November 2022
 Caps and goals correct as of:''' 23 November 2022, after the match against .

Recent call-ups
The following players have also been called up to the Serbia under-19 squad within the last twelve months and remain eligible:

Former squads 
 2014 UEFA U-19 Football Championship squads – Serbia
 2013 UEFA U-19 Football Championship squads – Serbia
 2012 UEFA U-19 Football Championship squads – Serbia
 2011 UEFA U-19 Football Championship squads – Serbia
 2009 UEFA U-19 Football Championship squads – Serbia
 2007 UEFA U-19 Football Championship squads – Serbia
 2005 UEFA U-19 Football Championship squads – Serbia and Montenegro

Head coaches

See also
 Serbia national football team
 Serbia national under-21 football team
 Serbia national under-20 football team 
 Serbia national under-17 football team
 UEFA European Under-19 Championship

References

External links
 Football Association of Serbia 
 Soccerway profile

European national under-19 association football teams
U